Dustin Will Cohen (born December 22, 1976) is a former American football linebacker who played for the St. Louis Rams of the National Football League (NFL). He played college football at Miami University.

References 

 

1976 births
Living people
Players of American football from Cincinnati
American football linebackers
Miami RedHawks football players
Buffalo Bills players
Chicago Bears players
St. Louis Rams players